Siah Rud District is in Jolfa County, East Azerbaijan province, Iran. At the 2006 National Census, its population was 8,507 in 2,086 households. The following census in 2011 counted 8,436 people in 2,284 households. At the latest census in 2016, the district had 8,006 inhabitants in 2,488 households.

References 

Jolfa County

Districts of East Azerbaijan Province

Populated places in East Azerbaijan Province

Populated places in Jolfa County